Annie Korzen is an American actress, comedian and writer.

Korzen is well known from the television show Seinfeld, appearing in the recurring role of Doris Klompus, an obnoxious neighbor living in Jerry's parents' Florida condo complex.  She was also seen on the show's season 4 episode, "The Airport", as an annoying airline passenger bothering Elaine Benes in economy class.

Korzen is married to Danish film producer Benni Korzen (Babette's Feast).  She is a graduate of Bard College in New York.

Acting career 
Korzen began her career as an actress-writer in New York Off-Broadway theater. She has appeared in television shows including Seinfeld, Whitney, and The Exes as well as in the motion pictures Tootsie, Stardust Memories, and Nobody's Perfect, which she co-wrote. She has also appeared in Transformers: Revenge of the Fallen, Neil Simon's The Prisoner of Second Avenue, and In Embryo, directed by Danish Actor Ulrich Thomsen.

Korzen has written, composed, and performed two solo shows. "Yenta Unplugged" celebrates Jewish women through comedy and music. The second show, "The Yenta Cometh" is about the price one pays for speaking out.

She is also a speaker on the lecture circuit with the interactive talks, "The Good Yenta: A Humorous Celebration of Jewish Women” and "Show and Tell with the Bargain Junkie". She also performs an evening of humorous stories called "Tales from the Mouth: Mishaps, Fiascoes, and other Triumphs".

In 1993, Korzen was a guest on The Oprah Winfrey Show, in an episode entitled "Ethnic Men Who Reject Their Own Women", a topic Korzen had suggested to the show's producers.

Writing career 
Korzen's commentaries have been heard on NPR's Morning Edition, and her essays have been printed in publications such as the New York Times, Los Angeles Times, San Francisco Chronicle, and the Jewish Journal of Los Angeles. Her spoken-word performances have appeared on showcases such as Comedy Central's "Sit 'n Spin", "Tasty Words", "Sparks" and The Moth.

Her book Bargain Junkie: Living the Good Life on the Cheap, is a humorous how-to about enjoying an upscale lifestyle on a budget. It was published by Andrews McMeel Universal.

Seinfeld episodes 
"The Pen" (1991)
"The Airport" (1992)
"The Raincoats" (1994)
"The Cadillac" (1996)

References

External links

American film actresses
American television actresses
Jewish American actresses
Living people
Actresses from New York City
Bard College alumni
People from the Bronx
1938 births
21st-century American Jews
21st-century American women